Cannabis in Zambia is illegal for recreational use. In December 2019, by unanimous decision, it was legalized for export and medicinal purposes only. Cannabis is known as Zam-Blaze,"chamba", chwang, or dobo in Zambia.

In March 2017, Home Affairs Minister Steven Kampyongo clarified that it is legal to cultivate cannabis for medical use if a license is obtained from the Minister of Health.  In May 2017, however, Health Minister Dr. Chitalu Chilufya stated that he has no intention of issuing any cultivation licenses.

References

Zambia
Drugs in Zambia